Charles Barnet Nemeroff (born 1949) is an American psychiatrist known for his works about depression. He is the author of numerous textbooks, papers, and clinical studies.

Early life and education
Nemeroff was born in New York City and attended the City College of New York. During his freshman year at the college, he visited Manhattan State Hospital where he decided to pursue his career studying mental illness. He also participated in an undergraduate research program sponsored by the National Science Foundation. Nemeroff went to work as a technician in a neuropathology laboratory in Boston after graduating in 1970. He subsequently returned to school where he received a master's degree in Biology in 1973 from Northeastern University. He then earned his PhD in neurobiology in 1973 and his M.D. in 1981, both from the University of North Carolina at Chapel Hill.

Career

Nemeroff joined the faculty of Duke University after completing his training, then took a position at the Emory University School of Medicine in 1991. During his time at Emory, he built the psychiatry department into one of the field's leading centers and became internationally recognized as a leader in psychiatric research.

Nemeroff has drawn criticism for accepting consulting fees from drug companies whose products he has reviewed. In 2008, he resigned from the position of chairman after Emory University found him in violation of policy for not disclosing payments received from drug makers for consulting fees. He was forbade to apply for or be involved with any National Institutes of Health grants for a period of two years. At the time he left the university, he was considered one of the nation's most influential psychiatrists, having written more than 850 research reports and reviews.

In 2009, Nemeroff became the chair of psychiatry at the University of Miami Miller School of Medicine. In 2018, Nemeroff became chair and professor of psychiatry at the University of Texas at Austin Dell Medical School.

See also
 Medical ethics

References

External links
 

1949 births
Living people
American psychiatrists
20th-century American Jews
University of Miami faculty
City College of New York alumni
Northeastern University alumni
University of North Carolina School of Medicine alumni
21st-century American Jews
Members of the National Academy of Medicine